Haworth is a town in McCurtain County, Oklahoma, United States. The population was 297 at the 2010 census.

History
At the time of its founding, Haworth was located in Red River County, a part of the Apukshunnubbee District of the Choctaw Nation.

Geography
Haworth is located at  (33.845946, -94.652926).

Demographics

As of the census of 2018, there were 296 people living in the town. There were 160 housing units at an average density of 97.9 per square mile (37.9/km2). The racial makeup of the town was 81.36% White, 1.98% African American, 9.32% Native American, 1.98% from other races, and 5.37% from two or more races. Hispanic or Latino of any race were 5.65% of the population.

There were 140 households, out of which 34.3% had children under the age of 18 living with them, 45.0% were married couples living together, 19.3% had a female householder with no husband present, and 30.0% were non-families. 26.4% of all households were made up of individuals, and 12.1% had someone living alone who was 65 years of age or older. The average household size was 2.53 and the average family size was 3.04.

In the town, the population was spread out, with 29.7% under the age of 18, 9.6% from 18 to 24, 29.7% from 25 to 44, 18.6% from 45 to 64, and 12.4% who were 65 years of age or older. The median age was 32 years. For every 100 females, there were 102.3 males. For every 100 females age 18 and over, there were 91.5 males.

The median income for a household in the town was $18,750, and the median income for a family was $25,000. Males had a median income of $27,083 versus $26,250 for females. The per capita income for the town was $9,617. About 35.8% of families and 42.9% of the population were below the poverty line, including 47.8% of those under age 18 and 17.0% of those age 65 or over.

Notable person

 Tommy Bolt, golfer. Member of the World Golf Hall of Fame

References

External links
 Encyclopedia of Oklahoma History and Culture - Haworth

Towns in McCurtain County, Oklahoma
Towns in Oklahoma